John A. Chestnut (also spelled Chesnut) was a delegate to the 1868 Constitutional Convention of South Carolina. He also served in the South Carolina House of Representatives.

His grandfather was freed by Col. James Chestnut.

He, S. G. W. Dill, and Justus Kendall Jillson represented Kershaw County at the convention.

References

People from Kershaw County, South Carolina
African-American politicians
Year of birth missing (living people)